Chad Alan Bratzke (born September 15, 1971) is a former American football defensive end in the National Football League.

College career
Bratzke played college football at Eastern Kentucky University.  As a freshman, he totaled 47 solo tackles, 6 sacks, and 2 fumble recoveries. His career stats included 253 tackles (150 solo), 27 sacks and six posted 87 tackles (57 solo), 11 sacks and two fumble recoveries as a senior.  He was named Ohio Valley Conference Defensive Player-of-the-Year and Kodak All-America.  He earned OVC All-Defense honors as a junior after totaling 71 tackles (36 solo), nine sacks and one fumble recovery.

Professional career
Bratzke played ten seasons in the NFL, five for the New York Giants and five for the Indianapolis Colts.  He signed as unrestricted free agent from the Giants on March 1, 1999.  He was originally drafted in the fifth round of the 1994 NFL Draft.

In 2002, Bratzke started 16 games for a defense that ranked seventh in the NFL in points allowed, eighth in overall defense.  He started every contest for the third time in four years with the franchise (1999, 2000) and started all 63 appearances.  He helped team establish a formidable pass rush with two sacks and five quarterback pressures in the first two games at Jacksonville and vs. Miami.  Bratzke started the first eight games at RE, then started seven of the last eight games at LE.  He had 70 tackles (49 solo), six sacks, 30 QB pressures, five fumbles forced, three batted passes, one pass defensed and one fumble recovered. He ranked second on the team in QB pressures, while tackles ranked seventh.  He had stops in every contest with four or more tackles in 13 games and had six tackles, one sack and one forced fumble at Jacksonville.  Bratzke forced one fumble and had one sack and four solo stops vs. Miami.  He had one sack vs. Baltimore, and one sack and one forced fumble vs. Dallas.  He made his first career start at defensive tackle and had six tackles, one sack, one forced fumble and two QB pressures at Cleveland as the team rallied with goal-line stand after overcoming 16-point deficit.  He had six tackles (four solo) vs. NYG.  He has totaled 45 of 53.5 career sacks since 1998. He has eleven career multiple-sack games.  His 12 sacks in 1999 stands as one of seven double-digit individual sack seasons in franchise history (13.0, Dwight Freeney, 2002; 11.5, LB-Johnie Cooks, 1984; 11.0, LB-Vernon Maxwell, 1983; 10.0, DE-Jon Hand, 1989; 10.5, DE-Tony Bennett, 1995; 10.5, DE-Dan Footman, 1997).  He had posted four straight seasons with 80+ tackles (80, 1998; 81, 1999; 93, 2000; 80, 2001) until having 70 in 2002.  He has had two three-sack games with Colts (12/19/99 vs. Washington; 1/6/02 vs. Denver), one of nine Colts with a three-sack game since sacks became official in 1982, and it has been accomplished only 14 times during that span.

Personal
Bratzke and his family moved to Florida when he was seven, and while there he attended Bloomingdale High School in Valrico, Florida. He has made sizable donations to Eastern Kentucky University to build the Student Athlete Academic Success Center. He is currently heavily involved with CLF (Childhood Leukemia Foundation) and Joy’s House. He has made several appearances on Colts 2000 Care-A-Van tours.

See also
History of the New York Giants (1994-present)

1971 births
American football defensive ends
People from Valrico, Florida
Indianapolis Colts players
New York Giants players
Eastern Kentucky Colonels football players
Living people
Sportspeople from Hillsborough County, Florida
Ed Block Courage Award recipients